The Glasgow–Dundee line is a railway line linking Glasgow with Dundee via Stirling and Perth.

Route
Most of the route is shared with other services:
 Glasgow–Edinburgh via Falkirk line between Glasgow Queen Street and Greenhill Junction
 Croy Line between Glasgow Queen Street and Dunblane
 Edinburgh–Dunblane line between Larbert and Dunblane

Stations

Historical route
The route comprises the following historical railway lines:
 Edinburgh and Glasgow Railway between Glasgow Queen Street and Greenhill Junction (between Croy and Larbert)
 Scottish Central Railway between Greenhill Junction and Perth
 Dundee and Perth Railway between Perth and Dundee

Services

From December 2008
There is generally an hourly service throughout the day between Glasgow and Aberdeen.  In the current (May 2016) timetable, there are also a few additional services between Glasgow & Dundee which offer connections at the latter for stations further north.

From December 2018
There are also additional services between Glasgow and Dundee/Arbroath, calling at more intermediate stations.

References

External links
 Glasgow–Aberdeen Timetable 17 May - 12 December 2009

Transport in Glasgow
Transport in Angus, Scotland
Railway lines in Scotland
Standard gauge railways in Scotland